Cuimba is a town and municipality in Zaire Province in Angola. The municipality had a population of 69,194 in 2014.

References

Populated places in Zaire Province
Municipalities of Angola